Jens Hofer (born 1 October 1997) is a Liechtensteiner footballer who plays as a left back for FC Biel-Bienne and the Liechtenstein national team.

International career
Hofer made his international debut for Liechtenstein on 19 November 2018, starting in the 2018–19 UEFA Nations League D match against Armenia, which finished as a 2–2 home draw.
On 11 November 2021, during a World Cup qualifier against Germany, Hofer was given a red card for a horror challenge on Leon Goretzka. Hofer's boot made contact with Goretzka's face after both of them went for a cross from Jonas Hofmann.

Career statistics

International

References

External links
 
 
 

1997 births
Living people
Liechtenstein footballers
Liechtenstein youth international footballers
Liechtenstein under-21 international footballers
Liechtenstein international footballers
Swiss people of Liechtenstein descent
Association football defenders
BSC Young Boys players
Swiss Promotion League players
FC Münsingen players